John William Ross (15 August 1895 – 29 September 1943) was an  Australian rules footballer who played with Geelong in the Victorian Football League (VFL).

Family
The son of David Ross (1870-1945), and Elizabeth Ross (1872-1919), John William Ross was born at the Manchester suburb of Ramsbottom on 15 August 1895.

He married Doris Evelyn Temple Dawson (1897-1997) at Heywood, Greater Manchester, England on 15 April 1922.

Notes

External links 
 
 

1895 births
1943 deaths
People from Ramsbottom
Australian rules footballers from Victoria (Australia)
Geelong Football Club players
VFL/AFL players born in England